The Federal Security Service (FSB) of the Russian Federation is the main domestic security agency of the Russian Federation and the main successor agency of the Soviet KGB. Its main responsibilities are counter-intelligence, internal and border security, counter-terrorism, and surveillance.  Along with other federal ministries and agencies, the FSB created its own departmental awards subordinate to the state awards.  This is a detailed list of these awards.

Federal Security Service

Medals
The medals in the section below are placed in their correct order of precedence in accordance with the latest Order of the head of the FSB.

Decorations

Border Guard Service of the FSB
On March 11, 2003 Russian president Vladimir Putin changed the status of the Border Guard Service from an independent service into a branch of the Federal Security Service.

Decorations

See also
Federal Security Service
Awards of the Federal Protective Service of the Russian Federation.
Awards and Emblems of the Ministry of Defense of the Russian Federation
Awards of the Ministry of Internal Affairs of Russia
Awards of the Ministry for Emergency Situations of Russia
Awards of the Federal Protective Service of the Russian Federation
Ministerial awards of the Russian Federation
Awards and decorations of the Russian Federation
Honorary titles of the Russian Federation
Awards and decorations of the Soviet Union

References

Other sources
  Border Guard Service of the FSB Official site in Russian
 Internet Portal Russian Symbols In Russian
 Russian Legal Library - Decrees and Regulations Consultant Plus In Russian
 
  GARANT Legal Information Portal Latest Ministerial Orders - In Russian

External links
Official website of the Federal Security Service of the Russian Federation 
 Awards page of the Border Service Historical site In Russian

Orders, decorations, and medals of Russia
Intelligence and espionage-related awards and decorations
Military awards and decorations of Russia
Law enforcement agencies of Russia
Federal Security Service